The Polocin is a left tributary of the river Siret in Romania. It discharges into the Siret in Homocea.

References

Rivers of Romania
Rivers of Bacău County
Rivers of Vrancea County